Everett may refer to:

Places

Canada
 Everett, Ontario, a community in Adjala–Tosorontio, Simcoe County
 Everett Mountains, a range on southern Baffin Island in Nunavut

United States
 Everett, Massachusetts, in Middlesex County, Massachusetts north of Boston
 Everett, Missouri, an unincorporated community
 Everett, Nebraska, an unincorporated community
 Everett, New Jersey, an unincorporated community
 Everett, Ohio, an unincorporated community
 Everett, Pennsylvania, in Bedford County, Pennsylvania
 Everett Area School District, a public school district in Bedford Country.
 Everett, Washington, the county seat and largest city in Washington state's Snohomish County
 Everett Massacre, an armed confrontation between local authorities and members of the Industrial Workers of the World union
 Boeing Everett Factory, an airplane assembly building owned by Boeing
 Everett Township (disambiguation), a list of townships named Everett

Elsewhere
 Everett Range, Antarctica, an ice-covered mountain range in Antarctica

People

Last name
 see Everett (surname)

First name
 see Everett (given name)

Sports teams
 Everett Raptors, a professional indoor football team
 Everett AquaSox, a Minor League Baseball team of Northwest League
 Everett Silvertips, an American major junior ice hockey team

Other uses 
 Everett, the Microsoft pre-release codename for Visual Studio .NET 2003
 Everett Piano Company, a defunct piano company
 Everett Interpretation, another name for the Many-worlds interpretation
 Everett Railroad, a shortline and heritage railroad
 Everett Turnpike, a toll road in New Hampshire

Vessels - City of Everett 
 City of Everett, the first flight-worthy Boeing 747-100 airliner which first flew on 9 February 1969, it is currently located at the Museum of Flight
 , a whaleback steamship best known for being both the first American steamship to pass through the Suez Canal and the first to circumnavigate the globe, the ship was launched in 1894 and foundered in the Gulf of Mexico in October 1923

See also 
 Everette (disambiguation)
 Everitt, an American automobile manufactured from 1909 to 1912 by the E-M-F Company (Everitt-Metzger-Flanders)
 Evert (disambiguation)